Central chromatolysis is a histopathologic change seen in the cell body of a neuron, where the chromatin and cell nucleus are pushed to the cell periphery, in response to axonal injury. 
This response is associated with increased protein synthesis to accommodate for axonal sprouting.
In addition to traumatic injuries, central chromatolysis may be caused by vitamin deficiency (pellagra).

See also
Motor neuron

References

External links
Neurocytology and Basic Reactions (neuropathologyweb.org)

Pathology